Chandradip Singh also known as Chandradeep Singh or Chander Deep Singh is an Indian politician and former member of the Bihar Legislative Assembly. He is a member of the Communist Party of India (Marxist–Leninist) Liberation. He had represented the Piro constituency from 1990–1995 as a member of the Indian People's Front, a mass front of the Communist Party of India (Marxist–Leninist) Liberation.

References 

Living people
Year of birth missing (living people)
Communist Party of India (Marxist–Leninist) Liberation politicians